"Trouble with My Baby" is a song by English singer Paloma Faith. It was released on 11 August 2014 as the third single to promote her third studio album, A Perfect Contradiction (2014). The song was used to promote series 8 of Britain's Got Talent.

Inspiration and composition
The song, composed by Faith along with experienced songwriters Andrea Martin and Steve Robson, has been described as featuring Faith's standard mix of pop music and jazz along with Motown influences.

Faith stated in an interview that the song is inspired by a relationship she was having at the time. In detail, the man she attributes the song to was "her best friend, but too close (in a romantic sense)" and made her feel "like he was dragging my energy out of me". By borrowing money and requiring that she give him "constant emotional support", Faith concluded the man was just increasing the burden of her "already stressful life (as a musician)", and she wrote the song as an effective "message" to the man to tell him he was "being a bit of a pain". Lyrically, Faith expresses these ideas at the start of the song's verses: "Well you ask for money..." and "You got problems with emotion...".

Omission and postponement
This song was originally written with Steve Robson in synchronisation with Faith's sophomore studio album Fall to Grace, but was considered by Faith as "inappropriate" or "misfitting" in regards of that album's theme. As a result, the song was saved for a later album, specifically "A Perfect Contradiction".

Music video
Following an official audio, and teasers on Faith's Facebook, the official video for the song was released at midnight on 30 June 2014, garnering 17,000 views in 16 hours. As with the two previous videos from the album, the video was directed by Paul Gore of video directing company Somesuch & Co. It features a new recording of the song, with new vocals recorded over a slightly different instrumental, and visually, footage of Faith singing in a nightclub to a man is intercut with images of Faith's relationship with that man quickly going downhill, eventually ending in Faith killing the man.

Release history

References

Paloma Faith songs
2014 singles
2014 songs
RCA Records singles
Songs written by Steve Robson
Songs written by Andrea Martin (musician)
Songs written by Paloma Faith
Song recordings produced by Steve Robson
British disco songs